The 1974 Oregon Webfoots football team represented the University of Oregon in the Pacific-8 Conference (Pac-8) during the 1974 NCAA Division I football season. Led by first-year head coach Don Read, the Ducks compiled a  record  and were outscored 330 to 116. Home games were played in Eugene at Autzen Stadium.

A former head coach at Portland State, Read had been an Oregon assistant for two years (quarterbacks, receivers); he was promoted in early January, immediately after Dick Enright was fired by athletic director Norv Ritchey.

Through , this is the most recent season that Oregon football finished last in conference and is widely considered to be the worst season in program history.

Schedule

Roster

All-conference

One Oregon senior was named to the All-Pac-8 team; safety Steve Donnelly was a repeat selection.

NFL Draft

Two Oregon seniors were selected in the draft; tight end Russ Francis (16th) and defensive end George Martin (262nd); Francis sat out the 1974 season.

List of Oregon Ducks in the NFL draft

References

External links
 WSU Libraries: Game video – Washington State at Oregon – November 2, 1974

Oregon
Oregon Ducks football seasons
Oregon Webfoots football